Sleeping With the Devil: How Washington Sold Our Soul for Saudi Crude is a critique written by former Central Intelligence Agency officer Robert Baer regarding the relationship that exists between the United States and Saudi Arabia.  Baer asserts that the U.S.'s political relationship with the House of Saud is not only hypocritical of American values, but also forms an unstable foundation for the safety of the U.S. economy.

External links
American Prospect book review by Laura Rozen
BuzzFlash Interview with Robert Baer
CNN.com Transcripts - American Morning - interview with Baer

2003 non-fiction books
Non-fiction books about espionage